(), also known as , is a long Egyptian folkloric epic poem that narrates the life and heroic achievements of the Mamluk Sultan al-Zahir Baibars al-Bunduqdari.

Literary features
The poem features romantic images of gallant cavaliers, soldiers and explorers. For example, in telling the tale of the Syrian Ismailis of the Mamluk period  the Banu Isma’il, descendants of ‘Ali, are depicted as the archetype of honor and justice. Female members of the community such as Shamsa also feature in the Mamluk tale. Here, the Banu Isma’il is charged with special tasks such as saving Baybars from captivity by Genoese pirates.

See also
 Baibars al-Bunduqdari

References

Further reading
 Sirat al-Zahir Baibars, Printed by Mustafa al-Saba, Cairo 1923.
 Idem Republished in 5 volumes by Alhay'ah Almisriyah, Editor Gamal El-Ghitani, Cairo 1996. 
 Alzahir Baibars, Dar Almaref, Cairo 1986.
 Gamal El-Ghitani, Sirat Alzahir Baibars 1996.
 Al-Maqrizi, Al Selouk Leme'refatt Dewall al-Melouk, Dar al-kotob, 1997.
 Idem in English: Bohn, Henry G., The Road to Knowledge of the Return of Kings, Chronicles of the Crusades, AMS Press, 1969.
 Sadawi. H, Al-Mamalik, Maruf Ikhwan, Alexandria.
 The New Encyclopædia Britannica, Macropædia, H.H. Berton Publisher,1973-1974.
 Culture Encyclopedia, Kitab alshab, Cairo 1972.

Medieval Arabic literature
History of literature in Egypt
Epic poems in Arabic
Egyptian folklore